Hiran Spagnol, sometimes known as just Hiran (born October 29, 1971), is a retired Brazilian professional football goalkeeper, who played for several Campeonato Brasileiro Série A clubs.

Career
Born on October 29, 1971 in Linhares, Espírito Santo, Hiran Spagnol started playing professionally in 1993, defending Linhares, winning that season's Campeonato Capixaba. In 1994, he joined Guarani, where he played 40 Campeonato Brasileiro Série A games, and scored with a header in 1996. In 1998, he was signed by Atlético Mineiro, leaving the club in 1999, then joining Santo André, where he scored with another header. He briefly played for Remo in 2000, moving in the same year to Internacional, where he played 35 Série A games. After leaving Internacional in 2001, in the following year, Hiran joined Ponte Preta, where he played 14 Série A games, then retired in 2004, after a car accident that broke his pelvis. After his retirement, he started a career as a goalkeeping coach.

List of goals scored

Following, is the list with the goals scored by Hiran:

Honours 
Linhares EC
 Campeonato Capixaba: 1993

Aracruz
 Campeonato Capixaba: 2012

Colatina
 Campeonato Capixaba Série B: 2013

References

1971 births
People from Linhares
Brazilian footballers
Association football goalkeepers
Campeonato Brasileiro Série A players
Linhares Esporte Clube players
Guarani FC players
Clube Atlético Mineiro players
Esporte Clube Santo André players
Clube do Remo players
Sport Club Internacional players
Associação Atlética Ponte Preta players
Centro Educativo Recreativo Associação Atlética São Mateus players
Esporte Clube Aracruz players
Linhares Futebol Clube players
Living people
Sportspeople from Espírito Santo